Ocyropsidae is a family of ctenophores.

Taxonomy 
The family Ocyropsidae contains the following species:

Genus Alcinoe
 Alcinoe rosea Mertens, 1833
 Alcinoe vermicularis Rang 1828

Genus Ocyropsis
 Ocyropsis crystallina (Rang, 1826)
 Ocyropsis fusca (Rang, 1826)
 Ocyropsis maculata (Rang, 1826)
 Ocyropsis pteroessa Bigelow, 1904
 Ocyropsis vance Gershwin, Zeidler & Davie, 2010

References

Lobata